Anubandham is a 1985 Indian Malayalam-language drama film written by M. T. Vasudevan Nair and directed by I. V. Sasi. It stars Mammootty, Mohanlal, Seema, and Shobana. The film won four Kerala State Film Awards—Best Story (Nair), Best Actress (Seema), Best Child Artist (Vimal), and Best Editor (K. Narayanan).

Plot

A widow, Sunandha, lives in poverty with her child. Bhaskaran and Vijayalakshmi lives with their son Jayan in the neighbourhood. Desperate to earn a living, Sunandha starts a kindergarten with the help of her silent admirer, teacher and ex-lover, Murali Mash. Just as her life seems to be headed toward stability, a tragic event complicates their living situation in the village.

Cast

 Mammootty as Muraleedharan Master
 Mohanlal as Bhaskaran
 Seema as Sunanda
 Shobana as Vijayalakshmi
 Master Prasobh as Jayan
 Master Vimal as Harimon
 Thilakan as Menon
 Sukumari as Malu
 Kunchan as Krishnankutty
 Sankaradi as Joseph
 Premji as Valiya Nampoothiri
 Jagannatha Varma as Bhaskaran's Father
 Paravoor Bharathan as Rtd Judge (Vijayalakshmi's Father)
 Bahadoor as Madhavan
 Kunjandi as Hydrose
 Janardhanan as Police Officer
 Thodupuzha Vasanthi
 Jalaja as Sindhu

Release
The film was released on 29 March 1985

Box office
The film was commercial success.

Soundtrack 
The music was composed by Shyam and the lyrics were written by Panthalam K. P. and Bichu Thirumala.

Awards
Kerala State Film Awards
 Best Actress - Seema
 Best Child Artist - Master Vimal
 Best Story - M. T. Vasudevan Nair
 Best Editor - K. Narayanan

References

External links
 
 Anubandham at the Malayalam Sangeetham database

1980s Malayalam-language films
Indian drama films
Films with screenplays by M. T. Vasudevan Nair
Films directed by I. V. Sasi